The ECHL Most Valuable Player is an ice hockey award presented annually by the ECHL to the player adjudged to be the most valuable to his team. This award was first presented following the inaugural 1988–89 ECHL season to Daryl Harpe of the Erie Panthers.

List of winners

See also
ECHL awards

References

ECHL trophies and awards